Adelino José de Jesus Teixeira (born 4 June 1952) is a Portuguese retired footballer who played mainly as a left back or a defensive midfielder.

Club career
Over the course of 16 seasons Teixeira appeared in 322 Primeira Liga games, mainly in representation of FC Porto (nine years), with which he won two consecutive national championships – contributing with 39 matches combined – and one domestic cup.

In the 90s/2000s Teixeira coached several clubs, his biggest achievement being leading S.C. Espinho to the third position in the second division in 1995–96, with the subsequent promotion.

Honours
Porto
Primeira Divisão: 1977–78, 1978–79
Taça de Portugal: 1976–77
Supertaça Cândido de Oliveira: 1981

External links

1952 births
Living people
People from Oliveira de Azeméis
Portuguese footballers
Association football defenders
Association football midfielders
Association football utility players
Primeira Liga players
Leixões S.C. players
FC Porto players
Boavista F.C. players
F.C. Penafiel players
Portugal international footballers
Portuguese football managers
Leixões S.C. managers
F.C. Oliveira do Hospital managers
Sportspeople from Aveiro District